The 2019 season was the 12th season for the Indian Premier League franchise Kolkata Knight Riders. They were one of the eight teams that competed in the 2019 Indian Premier League. The team was captained by Dinesh Karthik and coached by Jacques Henry Kallis  with Simon Matthew Katich as assistant coach, Omkar Salvia as bowling coach and Abhishek Mohan Nair as mentor

Background

Player retention and auction

In November 2018, the Knight Riders announced their list of retained players for the 2019 season. The list included Dinesh Karthik, Robin Uthappa, Chris Lynn, Andre Russell, Sunil Narine, Shubman Gill, Piyush Chawla, Kuldeep Yadav, Prasidh Krishna, Shivam Mavi, Nitish Rana, Rinku Singh, Kamlesh Nagarkoti.

On 18 December 2018, the IPL player auction was held in which the Knight Riders signed up nine more players viz., Carlos Brathwaite, Lockie Ferguson, Joe Denly, Harry Gurney, Nikhil Naik, Shrikant Mundhe, Prithvi Raj Yarra and Anrich Nortje.

Team analysis
ESPNcricinfos Sreshth Shah predicted the Knight Riders to qualify for the playoffs and listed the team's strengths to be its "power-hitters", Dinesh Karthik's role as captain and finisher, and its spin bowlers' effectiveness. He also pointed out that the team has an "inexperienced pace attack" which had taken the fewest wickets and had the worst economy rate among all teams in the previous season. Hindustan Times wrote in its team preview that "anything less than play-offs will be seen as a failure" for the Knight Riders while also saying that winning the title in 2019 "may just be a step too far" for the team. Firstpost called Andre Russell the "fulcrum of the side" and acknowledged the "variety and depth in the squad." Suggesting the strength of the team to be its spin bowling department, News18 wrote "The variety the likes of Kuldeep Yadav, Sunil Narine and Piyush Chawla bring to the playing XI is unmatchable."

 Squad 
 Players with international caps are listed in bold.

 Coaching and support staff 

 Head coach –  Jacques Kallis 
 Assistant coach –  Simon Katich
 Bowling coach –  Omkar Salvi
 Spin bowling coach -  Carl Crowe
 Team manager - Wayne Bentley
 Strength and conditioning coach –  Adrian le Roux
 Physiotherapist –  Andrew Leipus

Ref

 Match results 
 League stage 

Statistics
Most runs

 Source:Cricinfo

Most wickets

 Source:'Cricinfo

Awards and achievements

References

2019 Indian Premier League
Kolkata Knight Riders seasons